H.H. Nawab Muhammad Iftikhar 'Ali Khan Bahadur (20 May 1904 – 20 November 1982), was the Nawab of Malerkotla, born at Malerkotla, eldest son of Ahmad Ali Khan of Malerkotla by his second wife Malika Zamani.

Educ. privately. Chief Minister of Malerkotla 1946–1947.  Succeeded on the death of his father, 16 October 1947. Installed at the Sheesh Mahal, Malerkotla, 1 March 1948. Merged his state into the Patiala and Eastern Punjab States Union (PEPSU), 20 August 1948. MLA PEPSU assembly 1952–1956, and Punjab state assembly 1969–1971. The GOI amended the Indian Constitution to remove his position as a "ruler" and his right to receive privy-purse payments, 28 December 1971. Author "History of the Ruling Family of Sheikh Sadruddin Sadar-i-Jahan of Malerkotla" (2000). Rcvd: Silver Jubilee (1935), Coron. (1937), and Indian Independence (1947) medals. m. (first) H.H. Nawab Zubaida Begum Sahiba (d. young from cancer), a cousin. m. (second) H.H. Nawab Yusuf Zamani Begum Sahiba (b. at Kurwai Fort, August 1906), youngest daughter of Mushfiq Meherban-i-Dostan Nawab Muhammad Yaqub 'Ali Khan, Nawab of Kurwai, by his wife, Nawab Umar un-nisa Begum Sahiba [Sarkar Amma], second daughter of H.H. Nawab Muhammad Ibrahim 'Ali Khan Bahadur, Nawab of Malerkotla. m. (third) at Tonk, 1947, H.H. Nawab Shakir un-nisa Begum Sahiba [Tonk Begum], née Sahibzadi Munawar un-nisa Begum, daughter of H.H. Amin ud-Daula, Wazir ul-Mulk, Nawab Hafiz Sir Muhammad Ibrahim 'Ali Khan Sahib Bahadur, Saulat Jang, Nawab of Tonk, GCSI, GCIE, by his fourth wife, Nawab Mulka Jamil uz-Zamani Begum Sahiba. m. (fourth) (div. 1974) Sajida Begum Sahiba (b. 1940; m. second, 1980, Haji Anwar Ahmad Khan, and d. at Mohali Hospital, 30 July 2006), MLA for Malerkotla in the Punjab state assembly 1967-72, Presdt. Malerkotla Punjab.

He was also the Chairman of Sherwan Group

References

Nawabs of Malerkotla

1904 births
1982 deaths